Rui Fernando Nascimento Borges (born 14 December 1973) is a Portuguese retired footballer who played as an attacking midfielder.

Playing career
Borges was born in Lisbon. During his extensive professional career he represented Casa Pia AC, Boavista FC (where he made his Primeira Liga debut), Académico de Viseu FC, C.F. União de Lamas, F.C. Alverca, C.F. Os Belenenses, C.F. Estrela da Amadora, C.D. Trofense – contributing with 26 games and two goals to their first ever top-flight promotion in 2008 – and F.C. Vizela.

Over ten seasons, Borges amassed Portuguese top division totals of 221 matches and 18 goals, mainly for Alverca where he spent four years.

Coaching career
Borges began his coaching career at Vizela in July 2011, as assistant to Quim Berto. In October 2012, he moved to another former employer Boavista, to assist new player-manager Petit.

References

External links
 
 

1973 births
Living people
Footballers from Lisbon
Portuguese footballers
Association football midfielders
Primeira Liga players
Liga Portugal 2 players
Segunda Divisão players
Casa Pia A.C. players
Boavista F.C. players
Académico de Viseu F.C. players
C.F. União de Lamas players
F.C. Alverca players
C.F. Os Belenenses players
C.F. Estrela da Amadora players
C.D. Trofense players
F.C. Vizela players
Portuguese football managers